Walter Dzur (18 November 1919 – 19 October 1999) was a German international footballer.

References

1919 births
1999 deaths
Association football midfielders
German footballers
Germany international footballers
Dresdner SC players